Supervised injection sites (SIS) are medically supervised facilities designed to provide a hygienic environment in which people are able to consume illicit recreational drugs intravenously and prevent deaths due to drug overdoses. The legality of such a facility is dependent by location and political jurisdiction. Supervised injection sites are part of a harm reduction approach towards drug problems. The facilities provide sterile injection equipment, information about drugs and basic health care, treatment referrals, access to medical staff, and, at some facilities, counseling. Most programs prohibit the sale or purchase of recreational drugs at the facility.

Terminology
Supervised injection sites are also known as overdose prevention centers (OPC), supervised injection facilities, safe consumption rooms,  safe injection sites, safe injection rooms, fix rooms, fixing rooms, safer injection facilities (SIF), drug consumption facilities (DCF), drug consumption rooms (DCRs), and harm reduction centers.

Facilities

Australia 
"Shooting galleries" (the term "shooting" is slang for injecting drugs) have existed for a long time; there were illicit for-profit facilities in Sydney, Australia during the 1990s. Authors differentiated the legally sanctioned sites in Australia from those examples in the care they provide. While the operators of the shooting galleries exemplified in Sydney had little regard for the health of their clients, modern supervised injection facilities are a professionally staffed health and welfare service. The same journal describes the same facility in Australian context as "in general"  may be defined as "legally sanctioned and supervised facilities designed to reduce the health and public order problems associated with illegal injection drug use"

The legality of supervised injection is handled on a state-by state basis. New South Wales trialed a supervised injection site in Sydney in 2001, which was made permanent in 2010. Victoria also opened a supervised injection site in Melbourne in 2018 on a trial basis; in 2020 the trial was extended for a further three years and a second site approved. The second site in Melbourne has now been delayed pending a review. The second site was slated to be placed in a building on Flinder's street which had previously housed Yooralla.

Europe 
The first professionally staffed service where drug injection was accepted emerged in the Netherlands during the early 1970s as part of the "alternative youth service" provided by the St. Paul's church in Rotterdam. At its peak it had two centers that combined an informal meeting place with a drop-in center providing basic health care, food and a laundering service. One of the centers was also a pioneer in providing needle-exchange. Its purpose was to improve the psychosocial function and health of its clients. The centers received some support from law enforcement and local government officials, although they were not officially sanctioned until 1996.

The first modern supervised consumption site was opened in Berne, Switzerland in June, 1986.  Part of a project combatting HIV, the general concept of the café was a place where simple meals and beverages would be served, and information on safe sex, safe drug use, condoms and clean needles provided. Social workers providing counselling and referrals were also present. An injection room was not originally conceived, however, drug users began to use the facility for this purpose, and this soon became the most attractive aspect of the café. After discussions with the police and legislature, the café was turned into the first legally sanctioned drug consumption facility provided that no one under the age of 18 was admitted.

During the 1990s additional legal facilities emerged in other cities in Switzerland, Germany and the Netherlands. In the first decade of 2000, facilities opened in Spain, Luxembourg, and Norway.

Whereas injection facilities in Europe often evolved from something else, such as different social and medical outreaches or perhaps a homeless shelter, the degree and quality of actual supervision varies. The history of the European centers also mean that there have been no or little systematic collection of data needed to do a proper evaluation of effectiveness of the scheme. At the beginning of 2009 there were 92 facilities operating in 61 cities, including 30 cities in the Netherlands, 16 cities in Germany and 8 cities in Switzerland. Denmark passed a law allowing municipalities to run "fix rooms" in 2012, and by the end of 2013 there were three open. The United Kingdom opened one (officially unsanctioned) facility in Glasgow in September 2020. It was opened by Peter Krykant, a local drugs worker; however, lack of funding and support led to its closure in May 2021. Ireland has legislation to permit the opening of a service (as of May 2017) in the Misuse of Drugs (Supervised Injecting Facilities) Bill 2017, however, has been halted by planning concerns.

To date in July 2022, according to European Monitoring Centre for Drugs and Drug Addiction Belgium has one facility, Denmark five, France two, Germany 25, Greece one, Luxembourg two, Netherlands 25, Norway two, Portugal two, Spain 13, and Switzerland 14.

Canada 
There are 39 government authorized SCS in Canada as of July 2019: 7 in Alberta, 9 in British Columbia, 19 in Ontario, and 4 in Quebec. An exemption to controlled substances law under Canadian Criminal Code is granted inside the facilities, but drug possession remains illegal outside the facility and there is no buffer zone around the facility. Canada's first SCS, Insite in Downtown Eastside of Vancouver, commenced operation in 2003. In August 2020, ARCHES Lethbridge in Lethbridge, Alberta, the largest SCS in North America, closed shortly after Alberta revoked their grant for misuse of grant funds. Shortly after opening in February 2018, ARCHES Lethbridge found itself repetitively necessitating police intervention and/or emergency medical services for opioid-related issues; indeed, three weeks after its closure, the city noted a 36% decline in opioid-related EMS requests.

Expenditure 
The average per-capita operating cost of government sanctioned sites are reported to be CAD$600 per unique-client, with the exception of the ARCHES Lethbridge which had a disproportionately high cost of CAD $3,200 per unique client.

Unauthorized site in Alberta 

In September 2020, a group in Lethbridge, Alberta led by an ARCHES employee started hosting an unauthorized SCS in public places in a tent. The group did not have authorizations to operate an SCS or a permit to pitch a tent in the park. The organizer was issued citations for the tent; and the Lethbridge Police Service advised that users utilizing the unauthorized SCS would be arrested for drug possession, because exemptions do not apply to unauthorized sites. This opening of this illegal drug consumption tent was controversial and became a subject of discussion at the City Council meeting.

United States 

Clandestine injection sites have existed for years. A New England Journal of Medicine study from July 2020 reports that an illegal supervised consumption site has been operating at an "undisclosed" city in the U.S. since 2014 where over 10,000 doses of illegal drugs have been injected over a five-year period. Supervised consumption sites with some degree of official sanction from a state or local government have been contemplated, but are rare due to the federal regulation of drugs and the explicit opposition of federal law enforcement to any form of decriminalization.

Denver (2018) 
In November, 2018, Denver city council approved a pilot program for a safe injection site with a 12-to-1 vote. The Drug Enforcement Administration's Denver field office and the United States Attorney's office for the District of Colorado issued a statement together on the proposed site stating that "the operation of such sites is illegal under federal law. 21 U.S.C. Sec. 856 prohibits the maintaining of any premises for the purpose of using any controlled substance."

Philadelphia (2020) 
A safe injection site in the United States was projected to open in Philadelphia February 2020, under the auspices of the organization Safehouse and with the support of the city government. Immediate neighbors strongly objected to the site, and the owner of the first proposed location withdraw a lease offer under pressure. United States District Attorney William McSwain sued to stop the Safehouse project, losing in district court in October 2019, but winning an injunction in January 2021 from a 3-judge panel of the United States Court of Appeals for the Third Circuit.

Safehouse said its proposed operation was "a legitimate medical intervention, not illicit drug dens" and claimed protection under the Free Exercise Clause because "religious beliefs compel them to save lives at the heart of one of the most devastating overdose crises in the country".

Maine (2021) 
Similar to Safehouse, Jesse Harvey attempted to claim religious freedom protection by forming the Church of Safe Injection in Maine. After his death from a drug overdose, the organization obtained a relaxation in regulations from the governor of Maine and approval from the Maine CDC to operate as an authorized needle exchange in several cities (but not a supervised injection site).

New York City (2021)  
The first government-authorized supervised injection sites that began operating in New York City on November 30, 2021 with the approval of Mayor Bill de Blasio. The New York City Department of Health and Mental Hygiene refers to the initiatives as "overdose prevention centers" (OPC); they are attached to the pre-existing syringe exchange programme sites. A peer-reviewed study of the first two months of the OPC's operation has been published in JAMA. News media have been allowed access to the OPC sites as well.

Public criticism of the New York City OPC's has so far been limited. One problem brought up by the leadership of the Metropolitan Transportation Authority is how use migrates from the centers to nearby New York City Subway stations when the OPC's are closed. In response Mayor Eric Adams called for the centers to be funded to operate continuously.

Though sanctioned by the city, the sites arguably remain illegal under federal law, and rely on non-enforcement by federal officials to keep operating. The United States Department of Justice, during the Presidency of Joe Biden, has signaled some openness and stated that it is "evaluating supervised consumption sites, including discussions with state and local regulators about appropriate guardrails for such sites, as part of an overall approach to harm reduction and public safety."

Elsewhere 
Local governments in San Francisco, Seattle, Boston, Vermont, Delaware, and Portland, Oregon have considered opening safe injection sites as well. Plans to open an injection site in Somerville, Massachusetts in 2020 were delayed by the COVID-19 pandemic.

Evaluations 

In the late 1990s there were a number of studies available on consumption rooms in Germany, Switzerland and the Netherlands. “The reviews concluded that the rooms contributed to improved public and client health and reductions in public nuisance but stressed the limitations of the evidence and called for further and more comprehensive evaluation studies into the impact of such services.” To that end, the two non-European injecting facilities, Australia’s Sydney Medically Supervised Injecting Centre (MSIC) and Canada’s Vancouver Insite Supervised Injection Site have had more rigorous research designs as a part of their mandate to operate.

The NSW state government has provided extensive funding for ongoing evaluations of the Sydney MSIC, with a formal comprehensive evaluation produced in 2003, 18 months after the centre was opened. Other later evaluations studied various aspects of the operationservice provision (2005), community attitudes (2006), referral and client health (2007) and a fourth (2007) service operation and overdose related events.  Other evaluations of drug-related crime in the area were completed in 2006, 2008 and 2010, the SAHA International cost-effectiveness evaluation in 2008 and a final independent KPMG evaluation in 2010.

The Vancouver Insite facility was evaluated during the first three years of its operation by researchers from the BC Center for Excellence in HIV/AIDS with published and some unpublished reports available. In March 2008 a final report was released that evaluated the performance of the Vancouver Insite against its stated objectives.

Some posit that safe injection sites help reduce improperly discarded needles in public. This was found to be the case in a report by the Canadian Mental Health Association in 2018. Prior to the establishment of a supervised injection site in Vesterbro, Copenhagen in Denmark in 2012, up to 10,000 syringes were found on its streets each week. Within a year of the supervised injection site opening this number fell to below 1,000.

There has been some attempt to standardise evaluation reporting across supervised injection sites in a type of Core outcome set with researchers from the United States funded by Drug Policy Alliance available; however, the intermediary process of how this consensus set was generated is unpublished.

The Expert Advisory Committee found that Insite had referred clients such that it had contributed to an increased use of detoxification services and increased engagement in treatment. Insite had encouraged users to seek counseling. Funding has been supplied by the Canadian government for detoxification rooms above Insite.

SIS sites and social disorder 

A longitudinal studyUrban Social Issues Study (USIS)from January 2018 and February 2019undertaken by University of Lethbridge's professor Em M. Pijl and commissioned by the City of Lethbridge, Alberta, Canada explore "any unintended consequences" of supervised consumption services (SCS) within the "surrounding community". The USIS study was undertaken in response to a drug crisis in Lethbridge that impacted "many neighbourhoods in many different ways." Researchers studied the "perceptions and observations of social disorder by business owners and operators" in a neighborhood where SCS was introduced. The report cautioned, that drug abuse-related antisocial behavior in Lethbridge, in particular, and in cities, in general, has increased, as the "quantity and type of drugs in circulation" increases. As the use of crystal meth eclipses the use of opiates, users exhibit more "erratic behavior". Crystal meth and other "uppers" also "require more frequent use" than "downers" like opiates. The report also notes that not all social disorder in communities that have a SCS, can be "unequivocally and entirely attributed" to the SCS, partly because of the "ongoing drug epidemic." Other variables that explain increased anti-social behaviour includes an increase in the number of people aggregating outdoors as part of seasonal trends with warmer temperatures.

Philadelphia's WPVI-TV Action News team traveled to Toronto, Canada in 2018 to make first hand field observations of several safe consumption sites already in operation. A drug addict interviewed by the reporter said she visits the site to obtain supply, but did not stick around and used the supplies to shoot up drugs elsewhere and acknowledged the site attracts drug users and drug dealers. A neighbor interviewed by the reporter said there was drug use before, but he reports it has increased since the site opened.

WPVI-TV's Chad Pradelli narrated the news team's observation as: Over the two days we sat outside several of Toronto's safe injection facilities, we witnessed prevalent drug use out front, drug deals, and even violence. We watched as one man harassed several people passing by on the sidewalk, even putting one in a chokehold. One guy decided to fight back and security arrived.

Sydney, Australia 
The Sydney MSIC client survey conducted in 2005, found that public injecting (defined as injecting in a street, park, public toilet or car), which is a high risk practice with both health and public amenity impacts, was reported as the main alternative to injecting at the MSIC by 78% of clients. 49% of clients indicated resorting to public injection if the MSIC was not available on the day of registration with the MSIC. From this, the evaluators calculated a total 191,673 public injections averted by the centre.

Vancouver, Canada 
Observations before and after the opening of the Vancouver, British Columbia, Canada Insite facility indicated a reduction in public injecting. "Self-reports" of INSITE users and "informal observations" at INSITE, Sydney and some European SISs suggest that SISs "can reduce rates of public self-injection."

Alberta, Canada 
In response to the opioid epidemic in the province of Alberta, the Alberta Health Services's (AHS), Alberta Health, Indigenous Relations, Justice and Solicitor General including the Office of the Chief Medical Examiner, and the College of Physicians and Surgeons of Alberta met to discuss potential solutions. In the November 2016 Alberta Health report that resulted from that meeting, the introduction of supervised consumption services, along with numerous other responses to the crisis, was listed as a viable solution. The 2016 Alberta Health report stated that, SIS, "reduce overdose deaths, improve access to medical and social supports, and are not found to increase drug use and criminal activity."

According to January 2020 Edmonton Journal editorial, by 2020 Alberta had seven SIS with a "100-per-cent success rate at reversing the more than 4,300 overdoses" that occurred from November 2017when the first SIS opened in the provinceuntil August 2019.

Calgary

Safeworks Supervised Consumption Services (SCS) 
Safeworks was located at the Sheldon M. Chumir Health Centre, which operated for several months, as a temporary facility, became fully operational starting April 30, 2018 with services available 24 hours, 7 days a week. From the day it initially launched in October 30, 2017 to March 31, 2019, 71,096 people had used its services The staff "responded to a total of 954 overdoses." In one month alone, "848 unique individuals" made 5,613 visits to the SCS. Its program is monitored by the Province of Alberta in partnership with the Institute of Health Economics.

In the City of Lethbridge's commissioned 2020 102-page report, the author noted that "Calgary’s Sheldon Chumir SCS has received considerable negative press about the "rampant" social disorder around the SCS, a neighbourhood that is mixed residential and commercial." According to a May 2019 Calgary Herald article, the 250 meter radius around the safe consumption site Safeworks in Calgary located within the Sheldon M. Chumir Centre has seen a major spike in crime since its opening and described in a report by the police as having become "ground zero for drug, violent and property crimes in the downtown." Within this zone, statistics by the police in 2018 showed a call volume increase to the police by 276% for drug related matters 29% overall increase relative to the three-year average statistics. In May 2019, the Calgary Herald, said that Health Canada announced in February 2019 of approval for Siteworks to operate for another year, conditional to addressing neighborhood safety issues, drug debris and public disorder. There has been a plan for mobile safe consumption site intending to operate in the Forest Lawn, Calgary, Alberta, however in response to the statistics at the permanent site at the Sheldon M. Chumir Centre, community leaders have withdrawn their support.

By September 2019, the number of overdose treatment at Safeworks spiked. The staff were overwhelmed and 13.5% of their staff took psychological leave.  They have had dealt with 134 overdose reversals in 2019 which was 300% more than the same time period from the previous year. The center's director reported they're dealing with an average of one overdose reversal every other day.

Lethbridge

ARCHES (Closed August 2020) 
In response to the mounting death toll of drug overdose in Lethbridge, the city opened its first SCS in February, 2018. The controversial SCS, known as ARCHES was once the busiest SCS in North America.

The province defunded ARCHES after an audit ordered by government discovered misuse and mismanagement of public monies. Around 70% of ARCHES funding comes from the province, and it chose to shut it down on August 31, 2020 after the funding was revoked. The audit found “funding misappropriation, non-compliance with grant agreement [and] inappropriate governance and organizational operations.” The government is looking into the matter to determine if criminal charges are warranted.

The City of Lethbridge commissioned a report that included an Urban Social Issues Study (USIS) which examined unintended consequences of the SIS site in Lethbridge. The research found that in smaller cities, such as Lethbridge, that in communities with a SCS, social disorder may be more noticeable. The report's author, University of Lethbridge's Em M. Pijl, said that news media tended to the "personal experiences of business owners and residents who work and/or live near an SCS", which contrasts with "scholarly literature that demonstrates a lack of negative neighbourhood impacts related to SCSs."

Impact on community levels of overdose 

Over a nine-year period the Sydney MSIC managed 3,426 overdose-related events with not one fatality while Vancouver’s Insite had managed 336 overdose events in 2007 with not a single fatality.

The 2010 MSIC evaluators found that over 9 years of operation it had made no discernible impact on heroin overdoses at the community level with no improvement in overdose presentations at hospital emergency wards.

Research by injecting room evaluators in 2007 presented statistical evidence that there had been later reductions in ambulance callouts during injecting room hours, but failed to make any mention of the introduction of sniffer dog policing, introduced to the drug hot-spots around the injecting room a year after it opened.

Site experience of overdose 
While overdoses are managed on-site at Vancouver, Sydney and the facility near Madrid, German consumption rooms are forced to call an ambulance due to naloxone being administered only by doctors. A study of German consumption rooms indicated that an ambulance was called in 71% of emergencies and naloxone administered in 59% of cases. The facilities in Sydney and Frankfurt indicate 2.2-8.4% of emergencies resulting in hospitalization.

Vancouver’s Insite yielded 13 overdoses per 10,000 injections shortly after commencement, but in 2009 had more than doubled to 27 per 10,000. The Sydney MSIC recorded 96 overdoses per 10,000 injections for those using heroin.  Commenting on the high overdose rates in the Sydney MSIC, the evaluators suggested that,
 “In this study of the Sydney injecting room there were 9.2 (sic) heroin overdoses per 1000 heroin injections in the centre. This rate of overdose is higher than amongst heroin injectors generally. The injecting room clients seem to have been a high-risk group with a higher rate of heroin injections than others not using the injection room facilities. They were more often injecting on the streets and they appear to have taken greater risks and used more heroin whilst in the injecting room.

People living with HIV/AIDS
The results of a research project undertaken at the Dr. Peter Centre (DPC), a 24-bed residential HIV/AIDS care facility located in Vancouver, were published in the Journal of the International AIDS Society in March 2014, stating that the provision of supervised injection services at the facility improved health outcomes for DPC residents. The DPC considers the incorporation of such services as central to a "comprehensive harm reduction strategy" and the research team concluded, through interviews with 13 residents, that "the harm reduction policy altered the structural-environmental context of healthcare services and thus mediated access to palliative and supportive care services", in addition to creating a setting in which drug use could be discussed honestly. Highly active antiretroviral therapy (HAART) medication adherence and survival are cited as two improved health outcomes.

Crime 

The Sydney MSIC was judged by its evaluators to have caused no increase in crime and not to have caused a ‘honey-pot effect’ of drawing users and drug dealers to the Kings Cross area.

Observations before and after the opening of Insite indicated no increases in drug dealing or petty crime in the area. There was no evidence that the facility influenced drug use in the community, but concerns that Insite ‘sends the wrong message’ to non-users could not be addressed from existing data. The European experience has been mixed.

Financial impropriety by SCS service providers 
Audit of Lethbridge ARCHES SCS by Deloitte accounting firm ordered by the Alberta provincial government found the SCS had $1.6 million in unaccounted funds between 2017 and 2018; additionally they've found led $342,943 of grant funds had been expended on senior executive compensation despite the grant agreement allowing only $80,000. Beyond this, an additional $13,000 was spent on parties, staff retreats, entertainment and gift cards, and numerous other inappropriate expenditures.

Community perception 

The Expert Advisory Committee for Vancouver’s Insite found that health professionals, local police, the local community and the general public have positive or neutral views of the service, with opposition decreasing over time.

Predicted cost effectiveness 

The cost of running Insite per annum is $3 million Canadian. Mathematical modeling showed cost to benefit ratios of one dollar spent ranging from 1.5 to 4.02 in benefit. However, the Expert Advisory Committee expressed reservation about the certainty of Insite’s cost effectiveness until proper longitudinal studies had been undertaken. Mathematical models for HIV transmissions foregone had not been locally validated and mathematical modeling from lives saved by the facility had not been validated.

See also

 Biomedical waste
 Drug disposal
 Drug liberalization
 Drug policy of the Soviet Union
 Drug policy reform
 Illicit drug use in Australia
 Infection prevention and control
 Needle and syringe programmes
 Needle remover
 Needle sharing
 Needlestick injury
 Prevention of HIV/AIDS
 Preventive healthcare
 Responsible drug use

References

External links
 Community member in Philadelphia objects to SCS – Video on NBC 10 Philadelphia journalist's confirmed Twitter account.

Drug culture
Drug overdose
Drug policy
Drug safety
Epidemiology
Harm reduction
Infectious diseases
Medical emergencies
Medical ethics
Medical hygiene
Medical prevention
Medical waste
Medicine in society
Prevention of HIV/AIDS
Substance dependence
Types of health care facilities